Face à l'Océan is a 1920 French silent film directed by René Leprince.

Cast
Adrienne Duriez ... Hélène d'Argel 
Madeleine Erickson ... Louise Kermarech 
Christiane Delval ... Germaine 
Léone Balme   
Cosette Dacier   
Hélène Darly  
Jean Lorette   
Ernest Maupain   
Jean Salvat   
Schauer

External links 

1920 films
French silent feature films
French black-and-white films
Films directed by René Leprince
1920 drama films
French drama films
Silent drama films
1920s French films